Fade Away or Fadeaway may refer to:

Sports
 Fadeaway, a basketball move
 Screwball or fadeaway, a baseball pitch

Music

Albums
 Fade Away (Best Coast EP) (2013)
 Fade Away (Matt Finish EP) (1981)
 Fade Away, an album by Final
 Fade Away, an EP by Song I-han

Songs
 "Fade Away" (Another Animal song)
 "Fade Away" (Logic song) (2015)
 "Fade Away" (Oasis song)
 "Fade Away" (Bruce Springsteen song) (1980)
 "Fade Away", a song by Celine Dion from Taking Chances
 "Fade Away", a song by The Black Heart Procession recorded for Infamous 2
 "Fade Away", a song by Blur from The Great Escape
 "Fade Away", a song by Breaking Benjamin from Dear Agony
 "Fade Away", a song by Celldweller from Celldweller
 "Fade Away", a song by Chris Isaak from Chris Isaak
 "Fade Away", a song by Greg Cipes
 "Fade Away", a song by Diecast from Internal Revolution
 "Fade Away", a song by Che Fu from Navigator
 "Fade Away", a song by Juliana Hatfield from Gold Stars 1992–2002: The Juliana Hatfield Collection
 "Fade Away", a song by Junior Byles
 "Fade Away", a song by John McKeown from Things Worth Fighting For
 "Fade Away", a song by Loz Netto, guitarist for Sniff 'n' the Tears  (1983)
 "Fade Away", a song by Mary J. Blige from Growing Pains
 "Fadeaway", a song by Porcupine Tree from Up the Downstair
 "Fade Away", a song by Seether from Disclaimer II
 "Fade Away", a song by Susanne Sundfør from Ten Love Songs
 "Fade Away", a song by Kim Petras
 "Fade Away", a song by The Kid Laroi

Other uses
 Fade Away (novel), a novel by Harlan Coben

See also
 Fadeaway Man, a supervillain in the DC Comics universe
 "Fading Away", a 1988 song by Will to Power
 Not Fade Away (disambiguation)